John Beauchamp Jones (March 6, 1810 – February 4, 1866) was a writer whose books enjoyed popularity during the mid-19th century. Jones was a popular novelist (particularly of the American West and the American South) and a well-connected literary editor and political journalist in the two decades leading up to the American Civil War. During the war, he served in the Confederate War Department, and is today, above all, remembered for his published diary from the war period.

Antebellum life
Born in Baltimore, Maryland, Jones spent his childhood in Kentucky and Missouri. He settled in Arrow Rock, Missouri in 1835 as a storekeeper. Jones left Arrow Rock about the same time he was married, in 1840. The following year, he became editor of the Baltimore Sunday Visitor. His first novel, Wild Western Scenes, was serialized in the Visitor. Jones became editor of the pro-Tyler the Madisonian, later being rewarded for his efforts with the U.S. consulship at Naples. In 1857 he founded and edited the proslavery paper the Southern Monitor, in Philadelphia. Anticipating the outbreak of the American Civil War, he abandoned the paper, left his family behind, and fled to Montgomery, Alabama, arriving in Richmond, Virginia the day Fort Sumter was fired on.

Civil War
In Montgomery, Jones was employed as a high-ranking government clerk in the Confederate States War Department. When the Confederate government moved to Richmond, Virginia, his family joined him. From the first day of his flight from the North, Jones kept a diary, with the expressed objective of preserving the details of these eventful times for future publication. After the war, Jones and family returned to his farm at Burlington, New Jersey, and prepared his manuscript for publication. In 1866, the year of his death, it was published as A Rebel War Clerk’s Diary at the Confederate States Capital, although he would never see it in print. The published diary is one of the best sources of everyday life in Richmond during the war; also with details concerning the inner workings of the War Department. James I. Robertson, Jr. has called him "The Civil War's Most Valuable Diarist."

Literary activities
Jones's fiction and activities as an editor attracted the attention of other literary notables of the period, including Edgar Allan Poe and William Gilmore Simms. Jones' early novels, Wild Western Scenes: A Narrative of Adventures in the Western Wilderness, Forty Years Ago (1841), The Western Merchant: A Narrative . . . (1849), and Life and Adventures of a Country Merchant: A Narrative of His Exploits at Home, during His Travels, and in the Cities; Designed to Amuse and Instruct (1854), capture the picturesque and generally Edenic qualities of the West, where he spent his early years. Jones' novels commend the honesty of "the People" and predict their abiding success, based on the democratic republicanism of Thomas Jefferson

In Wild Southern Scenes. A Tale of Disunion! and Border War!, Jones wrote of

In popular culture
Jones appears as a humorous supporting character in Harry Turtledove's The Guns of the South, a science fiction novel set in the 1860s.

Works
Novels
 Wild Western Scenes, Grigg, Elliot and Co., 1849 [Luke Shortfield, pseud.]. 
 The Western Merchant: A Narrative. Containing Useful Instruction for the Western Man of Business, Grigg, Elliot & Co., [Luke Shortfield, pseud.] 1849.
 The City Merchant: or, The Mysterious Failure, Lippincott, Grambo & Co., 1851.
 The Rival Belles; or, Life in Washington, T. B. Peterson & Brothers, 1878 [1st Pub. 1852].
 Adventures of Col. Gracchus Vanderbomb, of Sloughcreek, in Pursuit of the Presidency: Also the Exploits of Mr. Numberius Plutarch Kipps, his Private Secretary, A. Hart, 1852.
 Freaks of Fortune; or, The History and Adventures of Ned Lorn, T. B. Peterson, 1854.
 The Monarchist: An Historical Novel Embracing Real Characters and Romantic Adventures, A. Hart, 1853. 
 The Winkles; or, The Merry Monomaniacs. An American Picture with Portraits of the Natives, 1855.
 Wild Western Scenes-Second Series. The Warpath: A Narrative of Adventures in the Wilderness, J. B. Lippincott, 1856.
 Life and Adventures of a Country Merchant : A Narrative of his Exploits at Home, During his Travels, and in the Cities, Designed to Amuse and Instruct, J. B. Lippincott, 1857.
 Wild Southern Scenes. A Tale of Disunion! and Border War!,  T. B. Peterson & Brothers, 1859. 
 Secession, Coercion, and Civil War. The Story of 1861, T. B. Peterson & Brothers, 1861.
 Wild Western Scenes; or, The White Spirit of the Wilderness. Being a Narrative of Adventures, Embracing the Same Characters Portrayed in the Original "Wild Western Scenes." New Series, 1863.
 Love and Money, T.B. Peterson, 1865.
 Life and Adventures of a Country Merchant: A Narrative of his Exploits at Home, During his Travels, and in the Cities, J. B. Lippincott, 1875.
Diary
 A Rebel War Clerk's Diary at the Confederate States Capital, Vol. 2, J. B. Lippincott & Co., 1866.

References

Citations

Cited literature
 Bradford, Gamaliel (1925). "A Confederate Pepys." The American Mercury, December: 470–478.
Cates, Misty (1999). "Jones, John Beauchamp (1810-1866)." Dictionary of Missouri Biography. University of Missouri Press.
Eicher, David J. (1997). The Civil War in Books: An Analytical Bibliography. University of Illinois Press.
 Lapides, Frederick R (1970). "John Beauchamp Jones: A Southern View of the Abolitionists." The Journal of the Rutgers University Libraries, 33(2): 63–73.
 Pierpauli, Jr., Paul G. (2013). "Jones, John Beauchamp." American Civil War: The Definitive Encyclopedia and Document Collection . ABC-CLIO.
 Jones, John Beauchamp. (1866). "A Rebel War Clerk's Diary at the Confederate States Capital." J. B. Lippincott & Co. 1: 16-17

External links
 
 
 The Southern Historical Collection: J. B. Jones Papers.
 

1810 births
1866 deaths
19th-century American male writers
19th-century American newspaper editors
19th-century American newspaper publishers (people)
19th-century American novelists
American diarists
American Civil War memoirs
American male novelists
American male journalists
19th-century American memoirists
American newspaper publishers (people)
American travel writers
Writers from Baltimore
Montgomery, Alabama in the American Civil War
People of Maryland in the American Civil War
Richmond, Virginia in the American Civil War
Novelists from Maryland
19th-century diarists